Børselv Church is a parish church of the Church of Norway in Porsanger Municipality in Troms og Finnmark county, Norway. It is located in the village of Børselv. It is one of the churches for the Porsanger parish which is part of the Indre Finnmark prosti (deanery) in the Diocese of Nord-Hålogaland. The white, wooden church was built in an octagonal style in 1958 using plans drawn up by the architect Valdemar Scheel Hansteen. The church seats about 300 people.

History
The first chapel in Børselv was built in 1909 by the architect K. Tessan. It was originally founded as a Sami mission chapel, called Børselv kapell. The chapel was burned down in 1944 when the retreating German army burned most buildings in Finnmark. After the war when funds were available (in 1957–1958), the church was rebuilt. The new church was consecrated on 16 March 1958.

See also
List of churches in Nord-Hålogaland

References

Porsanger
Churches in Finnmark
Wooden churches in Norway
Octagonal churches in Norway
20th-century Church of Norway church buildings
Churches completed in 1958
1909 establishments in Norway